Dymondia is a genus of flowering plants in the daisy family. There is only one known species, Dymondia margaretae, endemic to the Cape Province region of South Africa.

Cultivation 
 Light: full sun, part shade
 Habit: 2 inches high, spreads to make a carpet like ground cover.
 Water: very drought tolerant. Water may be needed at higher temperatures. The deep roots act as water wells providing water to the plant as needed. The dymondia carpet normally appears green/silver in color, but when roots are depleted and the plant needs water the leaves curl and their silver undersides are exposed to view.  Water as needed in the silver colored areas to uncurl the leaves and return to green/silver color.
 Cold hardiness: 20 °F
 Heat Tolerance: no known
 Origin: South Africa
 Soil: Very sandy – Soil mix of 40% vegetative matter, 30% red lava sand and 30% river sand. Perlite can be added to the mix as needed and provides faster growing in flats and pots.

Makes a flat, very drought tolerant ground cover and good lawn replacement in dry zones. Takes heavy foot traffic and often called living cement.
Works well  as a filler between flagstone, pavers, or stepping stones and other confined areas.
Soil retention: Excellent on slopes an hills due to the large diameter and deep root system.

References 

Monotypic Asteraceae genera
Endemic flora of South Africa
Arctotideae